The DaNang University of Economics is a university located in Da Nang, Vietnam. It was formerly known as DaNang University of Economics and Business Administration (Vietnamese: Trường Đại Học Kinh tế Đà Nẵng) The university is a member of regional university — the University of DaNang ("Đại học Đà Nẵng").

Beginning as the Faculty of Economics of Đà Nẵng Polytechnic University, a public university established in 1976, the university became its own institution in 1994, when a number of major educational institutions in Da Nang were reorganized. It is the largest university of economics in central Vietnam and the first to be established. The campus is at 71 Ngu Hanh Son Street, in Da Nang's Ngu Hanh Son District.

Academia
The DaNang University of Economics includes eight main faculties:

See also 
 Đại học Đà Nẵng 
 University of Danang official site
 Đà Nẵng University of Technology

External links 

 Official site

Universities in Da Nang